Ernesto Galli (25 July 1945 – 29 November 2020) was an Italian professional football player and coach.

Career
Born in Venice, Galli played as a goalkeeper for Udinese, S.P.A.L., Brescia, Cesena and Vicenza.

After retiring as a player he worked as a coach, and managed Vicenza between 1987 and 1989.

Death
He died from COVID-19 on 29 November 2020, aged 75.

References

1945 births
2020 deaths
Italian footballers
Udinese Calcio players
S.P.A.L. players
Brescia Calcio players
A.C. Cesena players
L.R. Vicenza players
Serie A players
Serie B players
Association football goalkeepers
Italian football managers
L.R. Vicenza managers
Deaths from the COVID-19 pandemic in Veneto
Footballers from Venice